Big White Mountain  is the highest mountain of the Okanagan Highland, Canada, and also of the Beaverdell Range, a subrange of that formation, which lies between the Okanagan Valley to its west and the main spine of the Monashee Mountains to its east.  The mountain lies between the head of the Kettle River and the source of Damfino Creek.

The mountain is commonly called 'Big White', a reference shared by the Big White Ski Resort built around its summit.

See also
 Monashee Pass (prominence col for Big White Mountain)

References

Two-thousanders of British Columbia
Mountains of the Okanagan
Monashee Mountains